Ulitsa Akademika Yangelya is a Moscow Metro station in the Chertanovo Yuzhnoye District, Southern Administrative Okrug, Moscow. It is on the Serpukhovsko-Timiryazevskaya Line, between Prazhskaya and Annino (Moscow Metro) stations.

The station is located at the crossing of Varshavskoye Highway with Akademika Yangelya Street (west) and Rossoshanskaya Street (east). It takes the name from Akademika Yangelya Street, which, in turn, was named after Mikhail Yangel, a leading missile designer. One of the proposed names for the station was also Rossoshanskaya, from another street at the crossing.

Ulitsa Akademika Yangelya was opened on 31 August 2000 and remained a terminal station until December 2001. The project was designed by architects Vladimir Filippov and Svetlana Belyakova.

References 

Moscow Metro stations
Serpukhovsko-Timiryazevskaya Line
Railway stations in Russia opened in 2000
Railway stations located underground in Russia